Carlos Emmanuel Olivero (born February 22, 1989), better known as Carlito Olivero, is an American singer and actor of Puerto Rican and Mexican descent. From 2007 to 2009, he was part of the Latin boy band Menudo after taking part in MTV's Making Menudo. Moving to Los Angeles in 2009, he appeared in various singing and acting events and in 2012 appeared in the film We the Party directed by Mario Van Peebles. In 2013, he auditioned for season 3 of the American singing competition series The X Factor and finished 3rd in the competition. He was mentored by Paulina Rubio.

Beginnings
Olivero was born and raised in Chicago, to a father from Puerto Rico and a mother from Mexico. He started singing very early, after his parents bought him a karaoke machine, and he sang along with it. His father and his aunt were break dancers. From grade one onwards, he started taking part in competitions singing mainly Elvis Presley, 'NSYNC and B2K songs.

In Making Menudo (2007)

In 2007, Carlito Olivero took part in an MTV reality series titled Making Menudo to earn a spot in the reconfigured famous Latin boy band. Ricky Martin and Draco Rosa were two of many who rotated through the band over the years. Making Menudo launched as a primetime series on October 25, 2007, but was later pushed to afternoons due to low ratings.

The initial Menudo five chosen in the program (JC, Jorge, Monti Montanez (Che Antonio), Jose and Chris) were put up against four other aspiring candidates who didn't make the cut (Antony, Pena, JC Gonzalez, Trevor and Carlos). Eventually Carlos [Olivero] was chosen to be included in Menudo's "final" set-up.

In band Menudo (2007–2009)

The "new" Menudo band was made up of:
Carlos Emmanuel Olivero
José "Monti" Antonio Montañez (Che Antonio)
Emmanuel Jose Vélez Pagán
Christopher Nelson Moy 
José Bordonada Collazo

The act was signed to a multi-album contract with SonyBMG label Epic Records. The group continued for two years starting in 2007 with their debut singles "Lost" and "More Than Words". The new Menudo disbanded in 2009.

The X Factor (2013)
In 2013, Olivero auditioned for season 3 of the American The X Factor. At the time he applied, he was employed as a server in a coffee shop. He was mentored by Paulina Rubio and finished the season in 3rd place overall.

Olivero's performances include:

 Olivero was in the bottom three and had to sing for survival. However, he survived the final showdown against Tim Olstad.
 Olivero was in the bottom three and had to sing for survival. However, he survived the final showdown against Rion Paige.

Acting career
After disbandment, Olivero relocated to Los Angeles to pursue a singing / acting career. He appeared in small roles in TNT network series Rizzoli & Isles and in an advertisement for Starbucks. and Time Warner cable. He appeared in season 6 episode 9 of Modern Family, as Teddy Keys, dating Alex.

In 2012, Olivero appeared in a main role in We the Party, a film written and directed by Mario Van Peebles. Credited as Carlito Olivero, he plays the role of Paco in the film.

From 2015 to 2017, Olivero starred in the successful Hulu Original Series, East Los High.  In 2018, Carlito starred in the YouTube Red scripted drama series, Step Up: High Water. He played the role of Derek Sandoval in the thriller film Bad Samaritan, directed by Dean Devlin, which premiered on May 4, 2018.

On October 18, 2019, it was reported that Olivero had been cast in the upcoming film Escape Room: Tournament of Champions, the sequel to the 2019 psychological thriller film Escape Room which was released on July 16, 2021.

Discography / Videography

Studio albums

Solo singles

Guest appearances

Music videos

Filmography

Film

Television

References

External links

21st-century American singers
21st-century American male actors
American male television actors
Menudo (band) members
The X Factor (American TV series) contestants
Living people
Singers from Chicago
American people of Puerto Rican descent
American people of Mexican descent
1989 births
21st-century American male singers